Huddard High School, is a private, CISCE-affiliated high school in the city of Kanpur, Uttar Pradesh, India. Classes are taught in English. Established in 1926, the school is one of the oldest schools in the city. The school motto is "Let your light shine".

History 
Huddard High School was founded in 1926 by Miss Ruth Dutton, a British missionary. It remained under the control of Scott Wilson, who was related to Dutton, until 1963. In 1970, it was taken over by Mercy Roberts and Ananda Morrow. In 1972, it came under the control of Sophie Shukla, who was the younger sister of Roberts.

Extracurricular activities 

School extracurricular activities include basketball, tennis, debate, elocution, dramatics, quizzes, music, and tae-kwon-do/karate.

References

1926 establishments in India
Educational institutions established in 1926
High schools and secondary schools in Uttar Pradesh
Private schools in Uttar Pradesh
Schools in Kanpur